Aavas Financiers, also known as Aavas, is a Jaipur based housing finance company known for providing home loans in the rural and semi-urban locations of India. Aavas is registered with National Housing Bank as a Housing Finance Company and was granted the license in August 2011.

History 

Aavas was incorporated in February, 2011 with the name of "Au Housing Finance Private Limited". It formally started its operations in March 2012. The name of the company was changed to "Aavas Financiers Limited" in March, 2017. Presently the company is headed by Sushil Kumar Agarwal as the MD and Sachinder Bhinder as the CEO.

The company issued its IPO in October 2018. Shortly after issuing IPO CDC group, United Kingdom has invested Rs. 200 Crore in Aavas.

In September 2019, the company received Rs 345 crore investment from International Finance Corporation, a member of the World Bank Group. In March 2020, Aavas signed an agreement with Asian Development Bank for receiving loan amount of $60 million specially targeting towards the 'women in lower income group'. In December 2020, to promote the concept of Green Housing, International Finance Corporation signed an agreement with the company. As of March 31, 2022, Aavas has 314 branches operating in 13 states of India.

In March 2022, Aavas was recognized by the Great Place to Work® Institute as among the best companies to work in India.

In August 2022, won Best NBFC award for the year 2020–21 at FE India's Best Banks Awards.

Stock Exchange Listings 

The equity shares of Aavas are listed on Bombay Stock Exchange where it is a constituent of the BSE 150 Midcap, and the National Stock Exchange of India where it is a constituent of Nifty Midcap 150.

References 

Housing finance companies of India
Companies listed on the National Stock Exchange of India
Companies listed on the Bombay Stock Exchange